Daniel Geissler (born 30 April 1994) is an Austrian footballer currently playing for Grazer AK on loan from TSV Hartberg. Besides Austria, he has played in the Netherlands and Germany.

References

External links

 

1994 births
Living people
Austrian footballers
Austrian expatriate footballers
Austrian expatriate sportspeople in the Netherlands
Expatriate footballers in the Netherlands
Austrian expatriate sportspeople in Germany
Expatriate footballers in Germany
FC Schalke 04 II players
Kapfenberger SV players
Regionalliga players
2. Liga (Austria) players
Association football midfielders